The Minhas Craft Brewery is located in Monroe, Wisconsin, owned by brother and sister, Ravinder and Manjit Minhas. It is the Midwest's oldest brewery and the second oldest in the United States. It survived the Great Depression, Prohibition and a fire. It is currently the 18th largest craft brewery in America.

Capabilities
The Minhas Craft Brewery produces a variety of over 233 beers, spirits, liqueurs and wines. Their products are shipped across Canada, the U.S. and 16 other countries worldwide (including: Brazil, Chile, China, Colombia, Costa Rica, England, Finland, Guam, Japan, Malaysia, Mexico, Norway, Panama and Trinidad). The facility offers daily brewery tours and beer tastings. It also houses the largest brewery memorabilia museum in the United States.

This brewery is one of the alcohol manufacturing companies owned by the Minhas siblings – collectively designated as Minhas Brewery- that generate more than $155 million in revenue annually. The other companies under the Minhas Brewery umbrella are: Minhas Micro Brewery in Calgary, Alberta, Canada; Minhas Distillery in Monroe, WI; and Pizza Brew Restaurant in Calgary, Alberta, Canada.

History
Minhas Craft Brewery opened in 1845 as the Monroe Brewing Company under the ownership of Mr. Bissinger. Since opening the brewery and property ownership changed hands ten times until the Minhas Siblings purchased it in 2006. Prior to the Minhas purchase the brewery was known as Joseph Huber Brewing Company. Upon acquisition Ravinder and Manjit Minhas changed the name to the Minhas Craft Brewery.

In 2021, the brewery partnered with the Nelk entertainment group to produce Happy Dad hard seltzer.

Beers
Minhas Craft Brewery packages beer, soda and alcopops in 236 mL, 355 mL, 473 mL and 710 mL aluminum cans; 207 mL, 330 mL, 650 mL and 1,183 mL glass bottles, and a variety of polyethylene terephthalate bottles.

Among the most well-known beers and malt beverages produced at Minhas Craft Brewery are:

Boxer
Varieties include Lager, Light, Blonde, Gluten Free, Ice, Watermelon, Apple Ale, Bubbly, Moscow Mule, and Hard Root Beer.

Lazy Mutt
Varieties include Farmhouse Ale, Gluten Free, Oktoberfest, Shandy, Alcoholic Ginger, Hefeweizen, Chocolate Cherry, Hazelnut Dark, Pumpkin Ale, Wet Hopped IPA, Winter Bock, Traditional IPA, So Cal IPA, American IPA, Belgian White Ale, and Strong Ale.

Bad Hare 
Varieties include Autumn Ale, Blonde Ale, Rum Ale, Rye Ale, Scotch Ale, Bock Light, Oatmeal Stout, Espresso Stout, and White Chocolate.

Uptown Girl 
Varieties include Premium Light, Cherry Belgian Red, and Strawberry Blonde.

Minhas Craft Brewery also produces Mountain Crest Classic Lager, Kirkland Signature Light, Simpler Times Pilsner, Huber Bock, 1845 Pils, Boatswain H.L.V. Ale, Minhas Swiss Style Amber, Axe Head Malt Liquor and Imperial Jack.

Trader Joe's

Minhas Craft Brewery Simpler Times Pilsner, Simpler Times Lager, Boatswain series and others are sold at Trader Joe's.

Kirkland
Minhas is the private label bottler of the Costco Brand Beer.

See also
Beer in the United States
List of breweries in Wisconsin

External links
Minhas Brewery
Minhas Distillery
Minhas Micro Brewery
Pizza Brew Restaurant
Minhas Private Label & Contract Packaging

References

Beer brewing companies based in Wisconsin